Park Seung-Il is a South Korean former professional footballer who last played as a forward for BPL side Saif Sporting.

Club career

Park joined Ulsan Hyundai in 2010 as one of the club's picks from the draft intake. Unused throughout the 2010 K-League season, Park made his first league appearance on 23 April 2011, coming on as a late substitute in Ulsan's away loss to the Pohang Steelers. He scored his first professional goal on 17 September 2011, in Ulsan's 3–1 win over Sangju Sangmu Phoenix.

He unsuccessfully trialled for Malaysia Super League team Terengganu F.C. I in January 2018.

Club career statistics

References

External links

1989 births
Living people
Association football forwards
South Korean footballers
Ulsan Hyundai FC players
Jeonnam Dragons players
Jeju United FC players
Gimcheon Sangmu FC players
FC Anyang players
Saif SC players
K League 1 players
K League 2 players
South Korean expatriate footballers
Bangladesh Football Premier League players
South Korean expatriate sportspeople in Bangladesh